

By merchandise exports
The table initially ranks each country or territory with their latest available merchandise or goods export values, and can be reranked (sort by ascending or descending) by any of the sources.

Notes

See also

 List of countries by exports per capita
 List of countries by imports
 List of countries by leading trade partners
 List of U.S. states and territories by exports and imports
 List of German states by exports
 List of countries by oil exports

References

 
Export